Heaven'z Movie is the first solo studio album by American rapper Bizzy Bone. It was released on October 6, 1998 via Ruthless/Relativity Records. Recording sessions took place at Ocean Way and at Groove Mine in Nashville, and at Music Grinder and at Studio 56 in Los Angeles. Production was handled by Bizzy Bone himself under his B.B. Gambini alias together with Mike Smoov, Johnny "J", Mafisto, Erik Nordquist, Cat Cody, Nina and Mike Johnson. It features guest appearances from Cat Cody, H.I.T.L.A.H. Capo Confucious and Mr. Majesty. The album reached number 3 on the Billboard 200 and number 2 on the Top R&B/Hip-Hop Albums in the United States, selling 130,000 units in its first week. It was certified Gold by the Recording Industry Association of America a month after its release date. The album is dedicated to the memory of Byron "Big B" Carlos McCane.

The songs "Marchin' on Washington", "Roll Call", "Yes Yes Y'all" and "Brain on Drugs" were cut short due to sample clearances not being made on time. Many songs did not make the album in time, leaving Heaven'z Movie incomplete. Songs omitted included the Tupac Shakur tribute "Life Goes On", "Trials & Tribulations", "Walking In Da Cold", "Way 2 Strong" from The PJs: Music from & Inspired by the Hit Television Series, "Relentless", "Retaliation", "Praise The Lord, Pass The Ammunition", "Power", "War Time", "Murder, Murder", "These Are My Family", "Seven", "10 Commandments", "Dying", "Mercenary", "Surrender My Love" and "Confessions".

Critical reception
Heaven'z Movie received mixed to positive reviews from music critics. Many reviewers criticized the cutting short of four prominent tracks ("Roll Call", "March On Washington", "Yes, Yes Ya'll", "Brain On Drugs") due to sample clearances. Matt Diehl of Entertainment Weekly gave the album a B− rating, stating "Bone Thugs-n-Harmony's youngest member continues their formula of hip-hop harmony, fire-and-brimstone spirituality, and roughneck rhymes on his solo debut. Bizzy Bone also throws in inner-city cautionary tales ("Social Studies") and flirts dangerously with fascism (check out guest H.I.T.L.A.H. Capo — Confucius' handle). Any enlightening messages in Heaven'z Movie are made unintelligible by Bizzy's over-the-speed-limit rapping, which will satisfy Bone Thugs aficionados — but confuse everyone else". AllMusic's Jason Birchmeier gave the album three out of five stars reviewing "One of the more troubled members of Bone Thugs-N-Harmony, Bizzy Bone takes the opportunity presented to him by his solo debut to explore much of his personal life. It's a fairly naked album, often confessional and, relative to his work with Bone, very serious. As such, it's an album orientated mostly toward Bone fans curious about the group's respective inner workings".

Track listing

Sample credits
Track 7 contains elements from "My Melody" written by Eric Barrier and William Griffin
Track 11 contains replayed elements from "The Roof Is on Fire" written by Charles Pettiford, Gregory Wigfall, Richard Fowler, C. Evans and Jerry Bloodrock
Track 12 contains replayed elements from "If Only You Know" written by Cynthia Biggs, Kenneth Gamble and Dexter Wansel

Personnel

Bryon "Bizzy Bone"/"B.B. Gambini" McCane II – main pefrormer (tracks: 1-6, 8-13), producer, mixing assistant (track 1), art direction
Adrian "H.I.T.L.A.H. Capo Confucious" Parlette – featured performer (track 6)
Cedric "Mr. Majesty" Feaster, Jr. – main pefrormer (track 7)
Torrance "Cat" Cody – additional vocals & producer (track 9)
Ronnie King – keyboards (tracks: 2, 4)
Michelle Foster – producer (track 1)
Dave Paisley – co-producer (track 1)
Johnny "J" Jackson – producer & mixing (tracks: 2, 4, 12), arranger (tracks: 2, 4)
Harold "Mafisto" Durrett – producer (tracks: 3, 8, 13), co-producer (track 5), mixing (track 13), engineering assistant (track 3)
Michael "Mike Smoov" Bell – producer (tracks: 5, 7, 10, 11), recording (track 10), mixing (tracks: 5, 10), engineering assistant (track 11)
Erik "E" Nordquist – producer & mixing (track 6), recording (tracks: 6, 11)
Mike Johnson – producer (track 8)
Jupiter Joe – recording (tracks: 1, 7, 9, 10), mixing (tracks: 1, 3, 5-8, 10, 11, 13), engineering assistant (tracks: 2, 4, 12)
Ian Boxill – recording & mixing (tracks: 2, 4, 12)
Alvin Williams – recording (track 3)
Chad Brown – recording (tracks: 5, 8, 13), engineering assistant (tracks: 9, 11)
Dean Fisher – engineering assistant (tracks: 2, 4, 12)
Joe Brown – engineering assistant (track 6)
David Bett – art direction
Chiu Liu – design
Randy Ronquillo – design
Daniel Hastings – cover photo
United Press International – photography
Bettmann Corbis – photography
Agence France-Presse – photography
Uniphoto – photography

Charts

Weekly charts

Year-end charts

Certifications

References

External links

1998 debut albums
Bizzy Bone albums
Horrorcore albums
Ruthless Records albums
Albums produced by Johnny "J"
Gangsta rap albums by American artists